WKNG-FM (89.1 FM, "Rejoice 89.1") is a non-commercial educational radio station licensed to serve Heflin, Alabama, United States. It broadcasts a Contemporary Christian format.

The station is owned by Covenant Communications, Inc. Leslie E. Gradick and his son Steven L. Gradick own a combined 90% interest in Covenant Communications. Gradick Communications (the parent company) owns the licensees for WKNG (AM), WCKS-FM, WLBB, and WBTR-FM, while a separate company Alabama 810 LLC (Owned by Leslie E. Gradick) owns the licenses for WCKA and WCKF.

History
More than three years after filing their initial application, this station received its original construction permit from the Federal Communications Commission on May 16, 2002. The new station was assigned the call letters WKNG-FM by the FCC on March 2, 2005.  WKNG-FM received its license to cover from the FCC on August 24, 2005.

Rejoice 89.1 started broadcasting a split format of Southern Gospel music during the day and Contemporary Christian music at night when the station signed on in 2005 and kept the format for 10 years. On September 7, 2015 (Labor Day), the format changed to Contemporary Christian.

The future
On April 4, 2006, the FCC granted this station a construction permit to upgrade to a class C3 facility with 1,000 watts of effective radiated power from an antenna placed at a height above average terrain of 254 meters (833 feet). The transmitter site would also move west by northwest to 33°40'52"N,85°48'55"W in the center of Anniston, Alabama. This construction permit is scheduled to expire on April 4, 2009.

WKNG-FM has also applied for a new 10 watt broadcast translator at 93.5 MHz in Rome, Georgia. This application has been before the Commission since March 2003 with no action as of December 2008.

References

External links
 
 
 

Southern Gospel radio stations in the United States
Contemporary Christian radio stations in the United States
Radio stations established in 2005
Cleburne County, Alabama
2005 establishments in Alabama
KNG-FM